, also romanized as Bunwa, was a Japanese era name (年号, nengō, lit. year name) of the Northern Court during the Era of Northern and Southern Courts after Kannō and before Enbun. This period spanned the years from September 1352 through March 1356.

Nanboku-chō overview
   
During the Meiji period, an Imperial decree dated March 3, 1911 established that the legitimate reigning monarchs of this period were the direct descendants of Emperor Go-Daigo through Emperor Go-Murakami, whose  had been established in exile in Yoshino, near Nara.

Until the end of the Edo period, the militarily superior pretender-Emperors supported by the Ashikaga shogunate had been mistakenly incorporated in Imperial chronologies though it was acknowledged that the Imperial Regalia were not in their possession.

This illegitimate  had been established in Kyoto by Ashikaga Takauji.

Change of era
 1352, also called : The new era name was created to mark the accession of Emperor Go-Kōgon. The previous era ended and the new one commenced in Kannō 3.

In this time frame, Shōhei (1346–1370) was the Southern Court equivalent nengō.

Events of the Bunna era 
 1352 (Bunna 1, 11th month): The grandfather of the emperor is advanced from the rank of dainagon to nadaijin. 1353 (Bunna 2): Kyoto occupied by southern forces under Yamana Tokiuji; and the capital was retaken by the Ashikaga.
 1354 (Bunna 3): Takauji flees with Go-Kōgon; Kitabatake Chikafusa dies.
 1355 (Bunna 4): Kyoto taken by southern army; Kyoto retaken again by the Ashikaga forces.

Notes

References
 Ackroyd, Joyce. (1982) Lessons from History: The Tokushi Yoron. Brisbane: University of Queensland Press. 
 Mehl, Margaret. (1997). History and the State in Nineteenth-Century Japan. New York: St Martin's Press. ; OCLC 419870136
 Nussbaum, Louis Frédéric and Käthe Roth. (2005). Japan Encyclopedia. Cambridge: Harvard University Press. ; OCLC 48943301
 Thomas, Julia Adeney. (2001). Reconfiguring Modernity: Concepts of Nature in Japanese Political Ideology. Berkeley: University of California Press. ; 
 Titsingh, Isaac. (1834). Nihon Odai Ichiran''; ou,  Annales des empereurs du Japon.  Paris: Royal Asiatic Society, Oriental Translation Fund of Great Britain and Ireland. OCLC 5850691

External links
 National Diet Library, "The Japanese Calendar" -- historical overview plus illustrative images from library's collection

Japanese eras
1350s in Japan